Merville Allen Oulton (July 22, 1888 – June 26, 1953) was a Canadian politician. He served in the Legislative Assembly of New Brunswick as member of the Conservative Party representing Westmorland County from 1925 to 1930.

References

20th-century Canadian politicians
20th-century Canadian physicians
Canadian surgeons
1888 births
1953 deaths
Progressive Conservative Party of New Brunswick MLAs
People from Westmorland County, New Brunswick
20th-century surgeons